The following is a complete chronology of the various line-ups of the alternative country music group Sixteen Horsepower.  Sixteen Horsepower (briefly known simply as Horsepower) formed in 1992 in Los Angeles, California, prior to relocating to Denver, Colorado.

Timeline

Member history chart
Members listed in the third column were touring and/or live guest musicians during the period indicated.

References

Sixteen Horsepower